Robin Adams is an English lyric baritone, a classical singer who has appeared in several major opera houses and concert halls.

Life and career 
Adams studied singing with Patricia MacMahon and Peter Alexander Wilson as well as piano and cello at the Royal Scottish Academy of Music & Drama in Glasgow and later on with Carol Blaickner-Mayo in Vienna. He won several awards and scholarships and started his career in 1996 singing the Ferryman in Curlew River by Benjamin Britten at the Edinburgh International Festival and at a Japan tour. Two other Britten roles – Billy Budd and Tarquinius in The Rape of Lucretia – paved his way to Glasgow and Vienna. Thereafter he was invited by the Wiener Kammeroper to sing in Strauss and Mozart productions.

After his successful Malatesta debut at the Landestheater Linz in 1999, Adams was invited to join the ensemble of this traditional Austrian opera company. He remained in Linz for two years singing principal parts from all eras of opera history. In 2002, Adams was invited to Stadttheater Bern, he moved to Switzerland and stayed there till today. His repertoire is very broad, it reaches from Claudio Monteverdi to contemporary classical music to Operetta, Pop and Musical. In Bern he has been performing in leading opera roles, but has also succeeded with a program called No opera allowed. He has taught singing at the Swiss Musical Academy as well as at the London College of Music and has also been invited to major opera houses of Europa and South America. At the Frankfurt Opera House he sang Traveller, Don Cassandro and Schaunard, at the Parisian Théâtre du Châtelet he debuted as Captain in Die Bassariden by Hans Werner Henze. At the Oper Leipzig he performed as Danilo and he is a frequent guest at the Theater Augsburg, the Theatre de la Monnaie in Bruxelles, the Teatro Liceo in Barcelone and the Edinburgh International Festival.

As a noted performer of contemporary music, his appearances have included Blazes (in The Lighthouse by Peter Maxwell Davies) for La Monnaie and Muziektheater Transparant, as well as Antigonus and Pickpocket II (in Boesmans' Wintermärchen) at the Liceu. He also took part in a series of world premieres:
 in 2000 as Kunstenaar Beck in Triumph of Spirit over Matter by Johan Thielemans and Wim Henderickx for La Monnaie, 
 in 2004 as Leonce in Leonce and Lena by Georg Büchner and Christian Henking for Theater Bern,
 in 2011 as Vicomte De Valmont in Quartett by Heiner Müller and Luca Francesconi at the Scala of Milano and 
 in 2015 as Husband in The Last Hotel by Enda Walsh and Donnacha Dennehy at the Edinburgh International Festival.

The original Quartett production by La Fura dels Baus from La Scala was since seen at Wiener Festwochen in Vienna, at Cité de la Musique in Paris, at Opéra de Lille and at the Holland Festival. In 2015 the production was presented at the Gulbenkian in Lisboa. In June 2015, Adams sang this role also at the Teatro Colón in Buenos Aires.

Adams is also active as a concert singer. He sang Alexander Zemlinsky's Lyric Symphony with the Moscow Symphony Orchestra, Bach's Magnificat with the English Chamber Orchestra at the Barbican in London and a recital of Hugo Wolf in Wolf's birth house. His concert repertoire also includes works by Henry Purcell, Handel's Messiah, Orff's Carmina Burana, Brahms' Deutsches Requiem, as well as Bach Cantatas and Passions and Mahler's Das klagende Lied.

Roles

Discography 
 Lieder und Klavierwerke by Walter Courvoisier, with Jeannine Hirzel (soprano) and Edward Rushton (piano accompaniment)

Accolades 
 Silver Medal of the Worshipful Company of the City of London
 Countess of Munster Scholarship, dedicated by Dame Janet Baker
 Lied Award of the Royal Academy

References

External links
 Robin Adams, official website

Living people
English operatic baritones
Alumni of the Royal Conservatoire of Scotland
Year of birth missing (living people)